This is a list of giant sequoia groves. All naturally occurring giant sequoia groves are located in the moist, unglaciated ridges and valleys of the western slope of the Sierra Nevada range in California, United States.

While many groves are within national park boundaries, such as Sequoia National Park and Yosemite National Park, most of the giant sequoia groves are under the care of the United States Forest Service, placing them outside the legislative mandate that excludes commercial timber harvest. Logging of non-sequoia timber continued as recently as the 1980, especially old-growth ponderosa and sugar pine, which have been logged almost to extinction amongst the groves.

Groves in the northern half of the range (north of the Kings River) are widely scattered and host smaller collections of giant sequoias than groves found within and south of the Kings River watershed. The groves are listed from north to south in the list below.

This list is based on five different sources, with slightly varying views on what constitutes a discrete grove; the differing interpretations are noted in italics. The lists of groves were compiled by Rundel (1972; recognizing 75 groves), Flint (1987; recognizing 65 groves), Willard (1994; recognizing 65 groves), the Giant Sequoia National Monument Visitor's Guide (2003), and the Draft Giant Sequoia National Monument Plan 2010. Currently, the U.S. National Park Service cites Rundel's total of 75 groves in its visitor publications. The updated lists from Willard and Flint are now known to be more accurate, therefore some of Rundel's 75 groves have been removed from this list. Below compiles a list of 81 giant sequoia groves.

North of the Kings River
The 7 groves north of the Kings River watershed are in Tahoe National Forest, Calaveras Big Trees State Park, Yosemite National Park, or Sierra National Forest (listed north to south):

Kings River watershed
The 18 groves in the Kings River watershed are in Kings Canyon National Park, the northern section of Giant Sequoia National Monument, or Sequoia National Forest, in southern Fresno County and northern Tulare County (listed north to south):

Kaweah River watershed
The 31 groves in the Kaweah River watershed are all in Sequoia National Park or in mixed BLM and private ownership, except the northernmost in Sequoia National Forest & Kings Canyon National Park (listed north to south):

Tule River, Kern River, and Deer Creek watersheds
The 25 groves in the Tule River, Kern River, and Deer Creek watersheds are mostly in Giant Sequoia National Monument, with some areas in Sequoia National Park, Mountain Home Demonstration State Forest, and Tule River Reservation; all are in southern Tulare County (listed north to south):

See also

 List of largest giant sequoias
 List of individual trees
 Black Mountain Grove (Southern California)

References

External links

Giant Sequoia National Monument: Location map of Groves — with list of all named groves in national monument.

 
Giant sequoia groves
Sequoiadendron
Giant sequoia groves
Giant sequoia groves
Sequoiadendron
Sequoiadendron
Sequoiadendron
Giant sequoia groves
Sequoiadendron
Sequoia groves